The Damariscove Lifesaving Station is a historic coastal maritime rescue facility, located on Damariscove Island in Boothbay, Maine. The station was built in 1897, and is one of the more architecturally distinguished of the surviving stations.  It was listed on the National Register of Historic Places on June 25, 1987.  It is now privately owned.

Description
Damariscove Island is the southernmost of a chain of islands extending south from the Maine coast, defining the eastern side of Boothbay Harbor.  It is roughly in the shape of an inverted Y, with a narrow channel between the legs of the Y.  The Damariscove Lifesaving Station is located facing this channel on the western leg.  It is an asymmetrically massed 1-1/2 story wood frame structure, its sections covered by hip roofs, with an octagonal observation tower at the southeast corner.  The boathouse portion of the station extends east from the main block, with the bay doors facing north.

History
The United States Life-Saving Service was established in 1874 by the United States government to provide marine rescue services along the nation's shores and waterways.  Between then and 1929, the Service, and its successor the United States Coast Guard, built twelve stations on the Maine coast.  This one was built in 1897, to design by the service's staff architect, Victor Mendelheff.  It is distinguished from the other surviving stations in the state by its octagonal observation tower, and a generally more sophisticated architectural style.  The station was manned by the Service and later the Coast Guard, until 1959. The station is now privately owned.

See also
National Register of Historic Places listings in Lincoln County, Maine

References

Government buildings on the National Register of Historic Places in Maine
Government buildings completed in 1897
Buildings and structures in Lincoln County, Maine
Closed facilities of the United States Coast Guard
Life-Saving Service stations
National Register of Historic Places in Lincoln County, Maine
Life-Saving Service stations on the National Register of Historic Places
Boothbay, Maine